Ranam-guyŏk is a district of the 7 kuyŏk that constitute Chongjin, North Hamgyong Province, North Korea.

Administrative divisions 
Ranam-guyok is divided into 19 neighbourhoods (tong) and 2 villages (ri).

References 

Districts of Chongjin